In computing, Verbose mode is an option available in many computer operating systems and programming languages that provides additional details as to what the computer is doing and what drivers and software it is loading during startup or in programming it would produce detailed output for diagnostic purposes thus makes a program easier to debug.

When running programs in the command-line, verbose output is typically outputted in standard output or standard error.

Such a program is cURL.

References 

Software features
Debugging